Germany participated at the 2015 Summer Universiade, in Gwangju, South Korea.

Medals by sport

Medalists

References

External links
 Country Overview Germany

Nations at the 2015 Summer Universiade
Germany at the Summer Universiade
2015 in German sport